Ghulam-Us-Saqlain Naqvi (Punjabi), (March 12, 1922 - April 6, 2002) was a Pakistani Urdu novelist and travel writer. was a Pakistani Urdu writer, best known for his short stories. His work often portrayed rural life.

Early life
He belonged to a Syed family in Chowki Handan, Nowshera in Rajouri district, Jammu. He was born to Syed Amir Ali Shah, who was a teacher. He had 6 more siblings that included 2 sisters and 4 brothers. He married at a young age and completed his study after his marriage. He had 4 sons and 1 daughter. His best friend and critic during his writing period was his younger brother Sajjad Hussain Naqvi, who was also a writer and critic.

Education
Naqvi studied from renowned institutions of Pakistan. He was a brilliant student and was fond of writing. He wrote his first short story "Afsana" at the age of 10. He did his Intermediate from Murray College, Sialkot. He did his master's degree in Urdu literature from Punjab University. He retired as assistant professor from Government College University, Lahore (Then Govt College Lahore) in 1983. After retirement he gave his life to Urdu literature and wrote books and columns on different topics.

Works
His famous novel is Mera Gaun (میرا گاؤں). The novel was translated in Chinese language. He started writing Urdu short essays at the age of 10. His short essay (MAHOL PR INSANI ZINDAGI K ASRAAT)is included in the course of Urdu book of 10th grade. Also wrote many articles and columns in DAILY NAWA E WAQT. His work has also been dramatized on PTV.

His books on short stories(افسانہ) include:
Band Gali
Shafaq k Saaye
Naghma Aur Aag
Lamhe Ki Deewar
Dhoop Ka Saaya
Sargoshi
Nuqte Sy Nuqte Tak

His novels include:
Mera Gaun(My Village)
3 Novelt

His travel literature (Safar Nama) include:
Arz e Tammanah
Chal Baba Aglay Shehar
Terminus sy Terminus Tak
He also wrote humour literature which was published as IK TURFA TAMASHA HAI

Death
He died in 2002 in Lahore and was buried at his hometown Bharath. The news of his death was published in leading newspapers like Nawa e Waqt, Jung, Khabrein etc.

References

Pakistani male short story writers
Pakistani short story writers
Pakistani novelists
Punjabi people
Urdu-language short story writers
1922 births
2002 deaths